KoVariome is the variome of Korean ethnic groups. It was initiated in 2010 when the Genome Research Foundation in Korea was established. KoVariome has produced around 100 Korean genome diversity data on 4 April 2018 in Scientific Reports and 1,094 Korean genome variation information on 27 May 2020.

References

Ethnic groups in Korea